University of Virginia shooting may refer to:

John A. G. Davis, a University of Virginia School of Law professor who was fatally shot on the UVA campus in 1840
2022 University of Virginia shooting, which occurred in November 2022